Bobbie Singer (born Tina Schosser, 22 February 1981, in Linz) is an Austrian singer, best known for her participation in the Eurovision Song Contest 1999.

Biography
Singer signed a record deal in 1996 at the age of 15, and released a single, "Egoistic", but this failed to chart.  In 1999 she was chosen internally by broadcaster ORF, with the song "Reflection", as the Austrian representative for the 44th Eurovision Song Contest, which took place in Jerusalem on 29 May.  On the night Singer gave an engaging performance and managed a tenth-place finish of 23 entries, coincidentally Austria's fourth tenth-place showing in ten years and the country's highest placing in the 1990s.   "Reflection" went on to become Singer's only entry on the Austrian chart, placing at No. 30. In 2000, she recorded "Before I Die", the theme to horror film , but this was not a commercial success.

Singer withdrew from the stage around 2005 and is currently working as a producer/music composer and is furthermore performing as a studiosinger and speaker.  In 2015, she gave birth to a daughter.

Singles

"Egoistic" (1998)
"Reflection" (1999)
"Waterfalls" (1999)
"Before I Die" (1999)
"Home" (2000)

References

External links 
 My Space Page

1981 births
Living people
Eurovision Song Contest entrants for Austria
21st-century Austrian women singers
English-language singers from Austria
Eurovision Song Contest entrants of 1999
Musicians from Linz
20th-century Austrian women singers
Austrian pop singers